Gerrit Hendrik Wormgoor (born July 29, 1940 in Utrecht) is a former water polo player from the Netherlands, who finished in eighth position with the Dutch Men's Team at the 1964 Summer Olympics in Tokyo, Japan.

References
 Dutch Olympic Committee

External links
 

1940 births
Living people
Dutch male water polo players
Olympic water polo players of the Netherlands
Water polo players at the 1964 Summer Olympics
Sportspeople from Utrecht (city)
20th-century Dutch people